Pseudoastygarctus is a genus of tardigrades in the family Stygarctidae. The genus was first described and named by McKirdy, Schmidt & McGinty-Bayly in 1976.

Species
The genus includes five species:
 Pseudostygarctus apuliae Gallo D’Addabbo, de Zio Grimaldi & D’Addabbo, 2000
 Pseudostygarctus galloae Hansen, Kristensen & Jørgensen, 2012
 Pseudostygarctus mirabilis de Zio Grimaldi, D’Addabbo Gallo & Morone De Lucia, 1998
 Pseudostygarctus rugosus Gallo D’Addabbo, de Zio Grimaldi & Sandulli, 2001
 Pseudostygarctus triungulatus McKirdy, Schmidt & McGinty-Bayly, 1976

References

Further reading
 McKirdy, Schmidt & McGinty-Bayly, 1976 : Interstitielle Fauna von Galapagos. 16. Tardigrada. [Interstitial Fauna of the Galapagos 16. Tardigrada] Mikrofauna Meeresbodens, no. 58, p. 1-42.

External links

Stygarctidae
Tardigrade genera